Andrés Tomás Prieto Albert (born 17 October 1993) is a Spanish professional footballer who plays as a goalkeeper for Dinamo Tbilisi of the Georgian Erovnuli Liga. He made occasional appearances in La Liga for Málaga and in the Segunda División for Real Madrid Castilla, and played regularly at Segunda B level over three seasons with Espanyol B, before spending a season in English football as backup goalkeeper at EFL Championship club Birmingham City.

Football career

Early career
Born in Alicante, Valencian Community, Prieto joined Real Madrid's youth setup in 2008, aged 15. He was named to the C team's pre-season program in the 2012 summer, but was later demoted back to the youth squad.

Despite appearing mainly with the Juvenil A squad, Prieto made his professional debut on 13 April 2013, replacing the injured Tomás Mejías in a 3–1 away success against Recreativo de Huelva in the Segunda División championship. In May 2013, he was promoted to the C team playing in the Segunda División B, but acted mainly as a backup to Alfonso Herrero during the campaign.

On 7 August 2014, Prieto moved to another reserve team, RCD Espanyol B, also playing in the third tier. He was a regular starter during his three-year spell at the club.

Málaga
On 4 July 2017, Prieto signed a two-year deal with Málaga CF. He made his La Liga debut on 21 October 2017, starting in a 0–2 away loss against FC Barcelona.

Prieto acted mainly as backup to Roberto during his first season, which ended in relegation. On 29 January 2019, after being demoted to third choice behind new signings Munir and Paweł Kieszek, he terminated his contract with the Andalusians.

Leganés
Prieto agreed a short-term deal with CD Leganés on 29 January 2019, hours after rescinding with Málaga. However, he failed to appear for the Pepineros, being called up for just two matches and acting as a third option behind Iván Cuéllar and Andriy Lunin.

Return to Espanyol
On 19 July 2019, Prieto agreed to a two-year deal back at Espanyol, and was assigned to the main squad in the top tier. Initially a backup to Diego López, he dropped to third choice after the arrival of Oier Olazábal, and terminated his contract with the club on 28 August 2020.

Birmingham City
The same day, Prieto signed for English Championship club Birmingham City on a three-year contract with the option of a fourth. He made his debut in the opening fixture of the season, a 1–0 defeat at home to fourth-tier Cambridge United in the EFL Cup; the goal came when Prieto was outjumped at a set-piece. He was a regular on the bench behind first-choice Neil Etheridge for most of the season, but his only other first-team appearance was in the 3–0 FA Cup defeat away to Manchester City. His contract was terminated by mutual consent on 15 July 2021.

Dinamo Tbilisi
Prieto signed a two-year contract with Dinamo Tbilisi, reigning champions of the Georgian Erovnuli Liga, on 13 August 2021.

Career statistics

References

External links

1993 births
Living people
Footballers from Alicante
Spanish footballers
Association football goalkeepers
Real Madrid Castilla footballers
Real Madrid C footballers
RCD Espanyol B footballers
Málaga CF players
CD Leganés players
RCD Espanyol footballers
Birmingham City F.C. players
FC Dinamo Tbilisi players
Segunda División B players
La Liga players
Segunda División players
Erovnuli Liga players
Spanish expatriate footballers
Expatriate footballers in England
Expatriate footballers in Georgia (country)
Spanish expatriate sportspeople in England
Spanish expatriate sportspeople in Georgia (country)